Volodya Margaryan known as Valmar (born 21 April 1948), is an Armenian painter. People's artist of Armenia (2015).

Biography
Volodya Margaryan was born in 1948 in Gyumri. 1966 he studied at Merkurov School of Fine Arts, Gyumri. 1972 he graduated from Yerevan Fine Arts Institute, he was a student of Armenian Painter and sculptor Yervand Kochar. Since 1972 Valmar participated in many exhibitions organized in the Armenian Republic and abroad. In 1976 he became member of the Artist Union of the USSR, since 1994 member of international union of artists (UNESCO). 1976-1980 he has been the director of Akhourian Fine Arts School and Secretary of the Armenian Artists Union of Gyumri. In 1980 he became head of the art department at Yerevan Art School #1. In 2004 Valmar founded "Valmar Art Gallery" in Yerevan.

Valmar is an author of many art and design books.

Valmar's works are kept in National Gallery of Armenia, Museum of Modern Art, Art Museum of Vanadzor, Echmiadzin, Jermuk and Gyumri, Museum of Friendship of Russia and Armenian Peoples (Abovyan), Ministry of Culture of Armenia (Archives of Fine Arts), The Tretiakov State Art Gallery, The Museum of Eastern Peoples, Ministry of Foreign Affairs, Archives of the Ministry of Culture of Russia, in Hammer Collection, Alex Manoukian Museum (Detroit), Kew Gallery New York, The “Stamp” company, Italy, “Eadou ko LTD” company, Japan, Galerie Basmajian, France.

Exhibitions
2013 Valmar art gallery, “Spanish Impression” Yerevan, Armenia
2012 Valmar art gallery, “Graphic Works” Yerevan, Armenia
2011 Valmar art gallery, “Venetian Impression” Yerevan, Armenia
2010 Valmar art gallery, Yerevan, Armenia
2009 Valmar art gallery, Yerevan, Armenia
2008 National Gallery of Armenia, Yerevan, Armenia
2007 “Stephani’s Art Gallery” La Canada, CA, United States
2006 Cultural Center of the City of Nant, France
2005 Valmar art Gallery, Yerevan, Armenia
2004 The first international Visual Art EXPO “Art Caucasus” Tbilisi, Georgia
2004 “International Club Berlin” Armenian Embassy, Germany
2003 Gallery Evan, New York, USA (Group Show)
2002 Cultural Center of the City of Athens
2002 Maison de la Artisanat, Marseille, France
2001 Green Art Gallery, Dubai, UAE
2000 Kew Gallery, New York City, USA (Group Show)
2000 International Art Festival, Kyiv, Ukraine
2000 Al Fayrouz Gallery, Manama, Bahrain
1999 Cite Internationale des Arts Paris, France
1998 Hovnanian School, New Jersey, USA
1998 National Gallery of Armenia, Yerevan, Armenia
1998 Armenian Embassy, Los Angeles, Washington, New York, USA
1997 Armenian Embassy, Montreal, Toronto, Ottawa, Canada
1997 Union Armenienne de Suisse, Geneva, Porrentruy, Switzerland
1996 Hilton Hotel, New York, USA
1996 Armenian Prelacy, New York, USA
1996 Galerie Etienne de Causans, Paris, France
1995 Hamazkayin, Aleppo, Syria
1995 Gallery Chaura, Damascus, Syria
1994 Maison Armenienne, Marseilles, France
1994 Galerie Les Cent, Paris, France
1994 Gallery Chaura, Damascus, Syria
1993 Armenian Prelacy, Beirut, Lebanon
1992 Union of Armenian Artists, Yerevan, Armenia
1992 Hamazkayin, San Francisco, USA
1991 Anahit Association, London, England
1990 Palace of Culture, Budapest, Hungary
1989 A.G.B.U. Art Gallery, Los Angeles, USA
1988 A.G.B.U. Art Gallery, Detroit, Los Angeles, USA
1987 Galerie Basmajian, Paris, France
1986 Zintari Creative House, Latvia
1986 Art Workers House, Moscow, Russia
1985 Journalists House, Yerevan, Armenia
1980 Tartu Artists House, Estonia
1977 Museum of Modern Arts, Yerevan, Armenia

Family
Valmar's daughter Hripsime Margaryan is the head of "Valmar Art Gallery", Yerevan. She is an artist and designer.

See also
List of Armenian artists
List of Armenians
Culture of Armenia

Gallery

References

External links

 Valmar

1948 births
People from Gyumri
Armenian painters
Living people